The 2020 College Basketball Invitational (CBI) was a planned single-elimination men's college basketball tournament to consist of 16 National Collegiate Athletic Association (NCAA) Division I teams that did not participate in the 2020 NCAA Division I men's basketball tournament or the NIT. This event would have marked the 13th annual tournament. On March 11, the tournament was canceled due to the COVID-19 pandemic.

References

External links
 College Basketball Invitational official website

2019–20 NCAA Division I men's basketball season
2020 College Basketball Invitational
Basketball events cancelled due to the COVID-19 pandemic